Oxynoemacheilus lenkoranensis, the Lenkoran loach, is a species of stone loach from the Lenkoran river drainage in Azerbaijan.

References

lenkoranensis
Taxa named by Yusif Alekper Abdurakhmanov
Fish described in 1962